Sahr Kendor (born 7 October 1962) is a Sierra Leonean sprinter. He competed in the men's 400 metres at the 1980 Summer Olympics.

References

1962 births
Living people
Athletes (track and field) at the 1980 Summer Olympics
Sierra Leonean male sprinters
Sierra Leonean male middle-distance runners
Olympic athletes of Sierra Leone
Place of birth missing (living people)